The Magnificents is the debut album by the Scottish electro rock band The Magnificents.

Track listing
All tracks written by The Magnificents.
 "Infidel Infidel (Six Fingered Hell)" – 2:29
 "Last Gasp Of Revenge" – 4:06
 "The Apollo Creed" – 3:16
 "Blueprint" – 2:33
 "Kids Now" – 2:30
 "Digital Dirt" – 4:57
 "M.I.A." – 4:02
 "This Is Active" – 2:49
 "Russian Disco" – 5:58
 "Ex-Airport" – 3:28
 "This Is The Magnificents" – 6:53

Production
The tracks Kids Now and Digital Dirt were taken from the previously released Kids Now EP (2001) and 4 Claws Of The Underground EP (2003) respectively. The remainder of the album was recorded at The Diving Bell Lounge Studio in Glasgow.

The Magnificents (Scottish band) albums
2004 debut albums